Statistics of Swedish football Division 2 for the 1969 season.

League standings

Norrland

Svealand

Norra Götaland

Södra Götaland

Allsvenskan promotion playoffs 
Sandåkerns SK - Hammarby IF 1-2
Hälsingborgs IF - Örgryte IS 0-4
Hammarby IF - Hälsingborgs IF 2-0
Örgryte IS - Sandåkerns SK 3-1

References
Sweden - List of final tables (Clas Glenning)

Swedish Football Division 2 seasons
2
Sweden
Sweden